Bad Day at Cat Rock is a 1965 Tom and Jerry cartoon produced and directed by Chuck Jones as essentially a remake of his 1963 Wile E. Coyote and Road Runner cartoon To Beep or Not to Beep. Maurice Noble was the cartoon's co-director, the animation was credited to Ben Washam, Ken Harris, Don Towsley and Dick Thompson. The music was scored by Eugene Poddany and backgrounds by Phil DeGuard. Mel Blanc was on hand to supply the screams, yells, and other vocal effects. The cartoon's title is a pun on the MGM film Bad Day at Black Rock, though the cartoon's plot bears no resemblance.

Plot
On a high rise Tom walks across a beam and stops to stare into the air. A black dotted line is formed in the air, and Tom walks across it. Jerry then creates one himself in the shape of stairs and then drops the stairs while Tom is on them, causing Tom to fall into a manhole. The title cards are then shown while Tom lights multiple matches (with Tom burning his hand on one).

Tom walks to a room and one of his matches ignites a stash of dynamite, which throws him out of the manhole and into the beam that Jerry is standing on. Jerry hits a second beam and then grabs onto Tom's fur. He uses the fur as a parachute down to a safe wood outcropping. Tom, brimming with rage, shows up, takes his fur back, and puts it back on. Tom only runs a few paces before realizing that his tail is still crunched up. He undoes his tail and pops it out, but loses his fur again.

Tom and Jerry are now chasing each other across high-rise beams, and Jerry discovers a yellow glove and gets in it. Tom is so far behind that Jerry has a plan. He "whistles" like a police officer and holds out his hand, and then points into the distance. Tom looks over Jerry's shoulder and gets punched. Jerry/glove counts "1, 2, 3" and then Tom gets up and throws punches at him. Jerry shakes Tom's hand and then throws him on top of the beam he is standing on. Jerry retrieves a cutting torch and cuts through the beam. Tom falls to earth with a section of the beam on top of his head and hits the ground with no visible damage until his body weight starts collapsing towards the lower part of his body.

Jerry slides down to the ground and Tom chases him behind some pillars. Both cat and mouse start to poke their heads out from different pillars until Tom sees Jerry's back and tries to poke his behind with a nail, but only pokes himself. Tom hits the top of the beam and falls to the ground. Jerry waves and whistles at the cat.

The remainder of the cartoon features Tom using a large rock and a see-saw, which consists of a beam balanced by a rock, to attempt to reach Jerry. Each rock has a different form after each unsuccessful attempt.

Attempt 1: Tom throws the rock onto the other side of the see-saw, but it is slanted too much to the right and Tom is launched sideways into another network of beams.

Attempt 2: Tom throws the rock straight up and squashes himself. Jerry's ears rattle from the recoil.

Attempt 3: Tom pitches the rock onto the other end, but it lands on its point and tips over several times, squashing the cat again. Jerry begins to look worried.

Attempt 4: Tom throws the rock to the other side, but it squashes the beam into a 90-degree angle and causes Tom to be shifted right and then fall on top of the rock. Jerry starts walking dejectedly across the beam he is on.

Attempt 5: Tom throws the rock up and it falls dead center, squeezing the beam and Tom around itself. Jerry kicks a pebble and it falls into a paint can. Jerry sees it next to a bunch of boards and prepares to write.

And Attempt 6: Tom throws the rock up and dashes away to a safe bunker. When he sees that the rock has landed perfectly, he jumps onto the other end and it catapults him up, but onto another beam and back down to the same end of the see-saw, and the rock is thrown up in the air and back onto him. At the same time, Jerry helps the viewers at home end the episode by painting when he's done, he pushes it onto the camera then the words "The End".

Crew
Story: Chuck Jones, Ralph Wright
Animation: Ben Washam, Ken Harris, Don Towsley, Dick Thompson, Harvey Toombs
Layouts: Ernie Nordli, Raymond Jacobs
Backgrounds: Philip DeGuard
Additional Backgrounds: Peggy Morrow
Vocal Effects: Mel Blanc
In Charge of Production: Les Goldman
Checking: Buf Nerbovig
Camera: Bill Kotler
Film Editors: Lovell Norman, Roger Donley
Sound: Ryder Sound Services
Story Consultant: Jack Kinney
Ink and Paint: Vera McKinney
Co-Director: Maurice Noble
Music: Eugene Poddany
Produced & Directed by Chuck Jones

References

External links

1965 films
1965 short films
Short films directed by Chuck Jones
Films scored by Eugene Poddany
Tom and Jerry short films
1965 animated films
1960s American animated films
Metro-Goldwyn-Mayer short films
1965 comedy films
Remakes of American films
Films directed by Maurice Noble
American comedy short films
Animated films without speech
Animated films about cats
Metro-Goldwyn-Mayer animated short films
MGM Animation/Visual Arts short films